The 1995 Baltic Cup football competition was the 15th season of the Baltic Cup and took place from 19 to 21 May 1995 at the Daugava Stadium in Riga, Latvia. It was the fifth annual competition of the three Baltic states – Latvia, Lithuania and Estonia – since they regained their independence from the Soviet Union in 1991.

Results

Latvia vs Estonia

Lithuania vs Estonia

Latvia vs Lithuania

Final table

Winners

Statistics

Goalscorers

See also
Balkan Cup
Nordic Football Championship

References

External links
RSSSF
RSSSF Details
omnitel

Baltic Cup (football)
Baltic Cup
Baltic Cup
Baltic Cup
1995
Sports competitions in Riga
Football in Riga